Butter Fingers is a 1925 American silent film sports comedy film directed by Del Lord starring Billy Bevan.

Cast

References

External links

1925 films
Mack Sennett Comedies short films
1926 comedy films
1926 films
Silent American comedy films
American black-and-white films
American silent short films
American comedy short films
1925 comedy films
Films directed by Del Lord
1920s American films